United Metro Energy Corp. is a family-owned energy company that supplies and delivers bioheat, biodiesel, heating oil, ultra-low sulfur diesel fuel, natural gas and gasoline from its terminals in Greenpoint, Brooklyn, New York and Calverton, Long Island, New York. United Metro Energy is currently building one of the largest biodiesel plants in North America, with a capacity up to 110 million gallons per year, directly adjacent to United Metro Energy's existing Brooklyn terminal. The biodiesel processing facility will be able to accept multiple feedstocks, including waste restaurant grease, animal fats, and soy and canola oil.  United Metro Energy plans to process 100% renewable biodiesel which can be blended with heating oil or diesel fuel. The plant will employ technology that will enable United Metro Energy to capture and utilize waste generated by the process. The plant is scheduled to open in Third Quarter 2012.

History 

United Metro Energy was founded in 1942 when Pauline Pullo recognized that home heating oil was a cleaner, more efficient alternative to coal in the heating fuel market. United Metro Energy remained a relatively modest retail operation until, in the late 1970s, when Paul J. and Gene V. Pullo, Pauline's grandsons, took over the company and started to grow the family-owned business.

In 1986, the Pullo brothers decided to acquire the present Greenpoint terminal, which put them into the wholesale business. Today, the company also has a delivered-in and fleet-fueling motor fuel business as well as a natural gas business. United Metro Energy provides full service to its customers and handles just about any heating fuel except propane, which is restricted in New York City.

Biofuels

Intro 

In 2004, when a federal mandate required gasoline to be produced with 10% ethanol, United Metro Energy adapted its blending operation to include ethanol, and in the process, became interested in biofuels, particularly biodiesel.  After touring a number of biofuel plants and talking to a number of biofuel producers, Paul and Gene decided to market biodiesel in the New York United Metro Energypolitan Area, which has the largest heating oil market in the country.

In early 2006, United Metro Energy received BQ-9000 certification, a quality control official recognition from the National Biodiesel Board. BQ-9000 assures that biodiesel is being produced to acceptable quality standards. Shortly after receiving this certification, in late 2006, United Metro Energy decided it would build a biodiesel processing facility adjacent to its terminal.

United Metro Energy ran a pilot plant at the Rutgers University Eco Center in 2008, where they tested all the potential feedstocks and were encouraged about the positive results with regard to quality, efficiency and emissions reductions.

Products 

United Metro Energy markets two biodiesel-based products. Greenheat, United Metro Energy's custom blended bioheat, was developed with the objective of helping home heating systems run cleaner and more efficiently, while reducing maintenance costs. Biomax is United Metro Energy's biodiesel-blended motor fuel. Its use in truck fleets is made to result in a cleaner burning, more efficient and more environmentally friendly fuel.

All of the trucks in United Metro Energy's Apollo fleet run on B20 Biomax, for eight months, and B5/B10 Biomax for four months in the winter. All told, this saves 750,000 pounds of carbon reduction for the year.

Legislations 

On July 26, 2010 New York City Mayor Michael Bloomberg, City Council Speaker Christine Quinn and other environmental leaders in the political and oil industries came to United Metro Energy's biodiesel plant to hold a press conference announcing an agreement on Local Law 43, a legislation that has been unanimously passed by the New York City Council which requires that a minimum of 2% biodiesel is blended into all grades of heating oil - #2, #4, and #6 beginning in October 2012.  Local Law 43 also requires that the sulfur content in #4 heating oil be reduced from 3,000 parts per million to 1,500 parts per million also beginning in October 2012.

Mayor Bloomberg signed Local Law 43 on August 16, 2010. By promoting the use of cleaner burning heating fuels, Local Law 43 meets one of the Mayor's fourteen air quality initiatives from PlaNYC.

Long Island development 
United Metro Energy's biodiesel, petroleum storage and blending facility is located at Enterprise Park in Calverton, Long Island. The facility is in conjunction with The Calverton Rail Access Rehabilitation Project. United Metro Energy's site is located at the former fuel testing facility in the Grumman Naval Weapons Station at the industrial park, and will be using their existing fuel tanks as well. The creation of this facility will allow United Metro Energy to transport its fuel via rail spur reducing truck transport from their Brooklyn terminal. With the revitalization of the rail spur, 2,500 truck trips can replace only 100 railcar trips. The groundbreaking of the rail spur took place on May 7, 2010.

References

External links
 

Oil companies of the United States